The 2022 General Tire Delivers 100 was the 13th stock car race of the 2022 ARCA Menards Series season, the 7th race of the 2022 Sioux Chief Showdown, and the 2nd iteration of the event. The race was held on Friday, August 19, 2022, in Watkins Glen, New York at Watkins Glen International, a 2.454 mile (3.949 km) permanent road course. The race took the scheduled 41 laps to complete. After an exciting finish, Brandon Jones, driving for Joe Gibbs Racing, moved Taylor Gray and Sammy Smith for the lead on the final restart, and held on to earn his eighth career ARCA Menards Series win, and his third of the season. Smith would dominate the entire race, leading all but two laps. To fill out the podium, Nick Sanchez, driving for Rev Racing, and Jesse Love, driving for Venturini Motorsports, would finish 2nd and 3rd, respectively.

Background 
Watkins Glen International, nicknamed "The Glen", is an automobile race track located in the town of Dix just southwest of the village of Watkins Glen, New York, at the southern tip of Seneca Lake. It was long known around the world as the home of the Formula One United States Grand Prix, which it hosted for twenty consecutive years (1961–1980). In addition, the site has also been home to road racing of nearly every class, including the World Sportscar Championship, Trans-Am, Can-Am, NASCAR Cup Series, the International Motor Sports Association and the IndyCar Series. The facility is currently owned by NASCAR.

Entry list 

 (R) denotes rookie driver

Practice 
The only 60-minute practice session was held on Friday, August 19, at 3:15 PM EST.

Qualifying 
Qualifying is scheduled to be held on Friday, August 19, at 4:25 PM EST. The qualifying system used is a multiple-car, multiple-lap system with only one round. Whoever sets the fastest time in the round wins the pole.

Race results

Standings after the race 

Drivers' Championship standings

Note: Only the first 10 positions are included for the driver standings.

References

External links 

2022 ARCA Menards Series
NASCAR races at Watkins Glen International
General Tire 100
2022 in sports in New York (state)